All Saints’ Church, Mugginton is a Grade I listed parish church in the Church of England in Weston Underwood, Derbyshire.

History
The church dates from the 11th century. It comprises a west tower, nave with south aisle and porch and a chancel. Restoration was undertaken in 1894 when the arch between the belfry and the church was opened up.

It was repaired in 1925 when the tower and west end were grouted and pointed.

Memorials
Nicolas Kniveton (d. 1500)
Joanna Knifeton (d. 1475)
Samuel Webster (d. 1759)
Samuel Pole (d. 1758)
William Bateman (d. 1821)

Organ
The pipe organ was built by  Peter Conacher. A specification of the organ can be found on the National Pipe Organ Register.

See also
 Grade I listed churches in Derbyshire
 Grade I listed buildings in Derbyshire
 Listed buildings in Weston Underwood, Derbyshire

References

Church of England church buildings in Derbyshire
Grade I listed churches in Derbyshire